Essays on Philosophical Subjects, by the Scottish economist Adam Smith, is a history of astronomy until Smith's own era, plus some thoughts on ancient physics and metaphysics.

This work was published posthumously (after death), in 1795, using material which Smith had intended to publish but had not prepared at the time of his death in 1790.  This was done by his literary executors, two old friends from the Scottish academic world; physicist/chemist Joseph Black and pioneering geologist James Hutton.  A brief account of their work appears in a section entitled 'Advertisement by the Editors'. 

The book consists of three distinct works:
 The History of Astronomy
 The History of the Ancient Physics
 The History of the Ancient Logics and Metaphysics

The History of Astronomy is the largest of these and is thought to have been written in the 1750s, before Smith's major works.  The overall understanding is excellent, though the Glasgow Edition of 1976 includes some detailed criticism of his use of sources.  It also defends him for calling Newton a philosopher rather than a scientist; the word 'scientist' did not exist before 1839.

It also contains Smith's first mention of the invisible hand:

 For it may be observed, that in all Polytheistic religions, among savages, as well as in the early ages of  antiquity, it is the irregular events of nature only that are ascribed to the agency and power of the gods.  Fire burns, and water refreshes; heavy bodies descend, and lighter substances fly upwards, by the necessity of their own nature; nor was the invisible hand of Jupiter ever apprehended to be employed in those matters.

Notes

External links 
Online edition

Books by Adam Smith
Philosophy books